Tom Larcombe (1881-1967) was an Australian racing cyclist with notable success in long distance road races.

Career highlights

1904
1st Australian national road race title and
Blue Riband for fastest in the Warrnambool to Melbourne Classic 
1906
1st Bathurst to Sydney 
1907
1st Australian national road race title and
Blue Riband for fastest in the Warrnambool to Melbourne Classic 
1908
Fastest Goulburn to Sydney Classic

Australian professional cycling career
Larcombe twice won the Australian national road race title by winning the Blue Riband for the fastest time in the Warrnambool to Melbourne Classic in 1904  and 1907. In 1907 Larcombe was riding from scratch in a new course record of 7h 40' 10" and his prize for the fastest time was another Massey-Harris bicycle. In 1908 Larcombe was unable to repeat his earlier success, finishing 87th after losing 16 minutes due to a puncture. He continued to compete in the Warrnambool finishing 89th in 1909  and 67th in 1910.

Larcombe lived in Goulburn and was a regular competitor in the Goulburn to Sydney Classic. His prize? Another Massey-Harris bicycle. He also received his expenses to travel to the Warrnambool to Melbourne. In 1904 Larcombe finished 3rd and had the 2nd fastest time behind Jack Arnst. In 1905 Larcombe finished well back in 36th. In 1906 Larcombe was the lone scratch rider and his arrival was not officially recorded, having been 1h 20' behind the leaders at Liverpool. Larcombe was 22nd in 1907  and 32nd in 1909.

References

External links

Australian male cyclists
1881 births
1967 deaths